Edith Clayton, née Drummond (September 6, 1920–October 8, 1989) was a Canadian basket maker.

Life and work 
The daughter of James Alexander Drummond and Selena Irene Sparks, who were descendants of Black Loyalists who left the United States in 1812-14, she was born Edith Drummond in Lake Loon, Cherry Brook, Nova Scotia. 

The basket weaving technique that she used originated in Africa and was passed along from mother to daughter over six generations. Clayton used natural dyes obtained from Mi'kmaq women. She sold her baskets at craft fairs across Canada and also taught classes in basket making. Her baskets were exhibited at Expo 86.

She died in East Preston at the age of 69.

Her daughters Althea Tolliver, Pam Drummond wall and Clara Clayton-Gough continue the family tradition of basket weaving.

Legacy 
Clayton appeared in Sylvia Hamilton's film Black Mother, Black Daughter. Scholar Peggy Bristow (in a volume edited by Hamilton) Clayton's impact as "passing on a significant and uniquely African-Nova Scotian aspect of the province's heritage."

Further reading 
 Edith Clayton's Market Basket: A Heritage of Splintwood Basketry in Nova Scotia

References 

1920 births
1989 deaths
Basket weavers
Black Nova Scotians
People from the Halifax Regional Municipality
Women basketweavers